The Tuggerah Lakes, a wetland system of three interconnected coastal lagoons, are located on the Central Coast of New South Wales, Australia and comprise Lake Munmorah, Budgewoi Lake and Tuggerah Lake.

History
The area around the Tuggerah Lakes was inhabited by the local Aborigines known as the Darkinjung people prior to European discovery in 1796. The lake system was discovered by the first Governor of Tasmania, Colonel David Collins, who had arrived on the First Fleet. They were found during the search for an escaped convict, Molly Morgan, who was thought to be living with the Aborigines to the north of the Hawkesbury River.

Description
The wetland system consists of three interconnected coastal lagoons: Lake Munmorah, Budgewoi Lake and Tuggerah Lake. All three lakes are shallow, with average depths of less than two metres (6.5 feet).

There is only limited movement of water between the lakes and sea through a narrow channel at The Entrance, and hence tides in the main body of the lakes are negligible. On occasions, this channel has slowly silted up with sand and the lakes have been completely cut off from the Pacific Ocean until a large flood scours out the channel again. It has been suggested that there was once a second entrance on the Budgewoi Peninsula, and although there is little evidence of this being the case since European settlement, occasionally waves do wash over the dunes into Budgewoi Lake during spring tides.

The lakes and their surroundings form part of the Central Coast Council (formerly Wyong Shire) local government area and can be crossed by road over three bridges:
 The Entrance Bridge passes over The Entrance Channel
 Toukley Bridge joins Toukley and Gorokan at the channel between Tuggerah Lake and Budgewoi Lake
 Budgewoi Bridge crosses the channel between Budgewoi Lake and Lake Munmorah at Budgewoi

Environment

The lakes are a major resource and provide not only recreational and fishing facilities, but also cooling waters for the Munmorah Power Station. It is also the main basin into which all the rivers and streams drain and it receives nutrients, chemicals and sediment from the entire area. Sediments and nutrients have been discharging into the lakes system for thousands of years although the process has greatly accelerated with urban development.

Important Bird Area

The lakes and their immediate surrounds, including the Munmorah State Conservation Area and most of the Wyrrabalong National Park, have been identified as an Important Bird Area (IBA) by BirdLife International because the shallow waters have extensive seagrass beds attracting large numbers of waterbirds, including 1% of the world populations of sharp-tailed sandpipers and chestnut teals.  The adjacent forests and woodlands provide habitat for endangered swift parrots and regent honeyeaters in the non-breeding season. Australasian and black bitterns are sometimes recorded in the IBA.  little egrets nest on Curly Island. Other birds using the site in relatively large numbers include black swans, curlew sandpipers and red-necked stints.

See also

 List of lakes of Australia

References

Lakes of New South Wales
Central Coast (New South Wales)
Important Bird Areas of New South Wales